The following is a list of players, both past and current, who appeared at least in one game for the TaiwanBeer HeroBears (2021–present) franchise.



Players

C

D

E

F

G

H

I

J

L

M

Q

S

T

V

W

Y

References

T1 League all-time rosters